Parwar (Balochi) is town and union council of Awaran District in the Balochistan province of Pakistan.

References

Populated places in Awaran District
Union councils of Balochistan, Pakistan